The 1967–68 Washington Huskies men's basketball team represented the University of Washington for the 1967–68 NCAA University Division basketball season. Led by fifth-year head coach Mac Duckworth, the Huskies were members of the Athletic Association of Western Universities (Pacific-8) and played their home games on campus at Hec Edmundson Pavilion in Seattle, Washington.

Duckworth resigned on March 19, and Tex Winter was hired away from Kansas State the following week.

References

External links
Sports Reference – Washington Huskies: 1967–68 basketball season

Washington Huskies men's basketball seasons
Washington Huskies
Washington
Washington